Gay Liberation Front (GLF) was the name of several gay liberation groups, the first of which was formed in New York City in 1969, immediately after the Stonewall riots. Similar organizations also formed in the UK and Canada. The GLF provided a voice for the newly-out and newly-radicalized gay community, and a meeting place for a number of activists who would go on to form other groups, such as the Gay Activists Alliance and Street Transvestite Action Revolutionaries (STAR) in the US.  In the UK and Canada, activists also developed a platform for gay liberation and demonstrated for gay rights. Activists from both the US and UK groups would later go on to found or be active in groups including ACT UP, the Lesbian Avengers, Queer Nation, Sisters of Perpetual Indulgence, and Stonewall.

United States

The United States Gay Liberation Front (GLF) was formed in the aftermath of the Stonewall Riots. The riots are considered by many to be the prime catalyst for the gay liberation movement and the modern fight for LGBT rights in the United States.

On June 28, 1969 in Greenwich Village, New York, the New York City police raided the Stonewall Inn, a well known gay bar, located on Christopher Street. Police raids of the Stonewall, and other lesbian and gay bars, were a routine practice at the time, with regular payoffs to dirty cops and organized crime figures an expected part of staying in business. The Stonewall Inn was made up of two former horse stables which had been renovated into one building in 1930. Like all gay bars of the era, it was subject to countless police raids, as LGBT activities and fraternization were still largely illegal. But this time, when the police began arresting patrons, the customers began pelting them with coins, and later, bottles and rocks. The lesbian and gay crowd also freed staff members who had been put into police vans, and the outnumbered officers retreated inside the bar. Soon, the Tactical Patrol Force (TPF), originally trained to deal with war protests, were called in to control the mob, which was now using a parking meter as a battering ram. As the patrol force advanced, the crowd did not disperse, but instead doubled back and re-formed behind the riot police, throwing rocks, shouting "Gay Power!", dancing, and taunting their opposition. For the next several nights, the crowd would return in ever increasing numbers, handing out leaflets and rallying themselves. Soon the word "Stonewall" came to represent fighting for equality in the gay community. And in commemoration, Gay Pride marches are held every year on the anniversary of the riots.

In early July 1969, due in large part to the Stonewall riots in June of that year, discussions in the gay community led to the formation of the Gay Liberation Front. According to scholar Henry Abelove, it was named GLF "in a provocative allusion to the Algerian National Liberation Front and the Vietnamese National Liberation Front." On August 2, 1969, the group held a protest at the Women's House of Detention in Greenwich Village and would go on to hold weekly protests there.

One of GLF's early acts included organizing a march protesting coverage of gay people by The Village Voice, which took place on September 12, 1969. The GLF had a broad political platform, denouncing racism and declaring support for various Third World struggles and the Black Panther Party. They took an anti-capitalist stance and attacked the nuclear family and traditional gender roles.

On October 31, 1969, sixty members of the GLF, the Committee for Homosexual Freedom (CHF), and the Gay Guerilla Theatre group staged a protest outside the offices of the San Francisco Examiner in response to a series of news articles disparaging people in San Francisco's gay bars and clubs. The peaceful protest against the Examiner turned tumultuous and was later called "Friday of the Purple Hand" and "Bloody Friday of the Purple Hand". Examiner employees "dumped a barrel of printers' ink on the crowd from the roof of the newspaper building", according to glbtq.com. Some reports state that it was a barrel of ink poured from the roof of the building. The protesters "used the ink to scrawl slogans on the building walls" and slap purple hand prints "throughout downtown [San Francisco]" resulting in "one of the most visible demonstrations of gay power" according to the Bay Area Reporter. According to Larry LittleJohn, then president of Society for Individual Rights, "At that point, the tactical squad arrived – not to get the employees who dumped the ink, but to arrest the demonstrators. Somebody could have been hurt if that ink had gotten into their eyes, but the police were knocking people to the ground." The accounts of police brutality include women being thrown to the ground and protesters' teeth being knocked out. Inspired by Black Hand extortion methods of Camorra gangsters and the Mafia, some gay and lesbian activists attempted to institute "purple hand" as a warning to stop anti-gay attacks, but with little success. In Turkey, the LGBT rights organization MorEl Eskişehir LGBTT Oluşumu (Purple Hand Eskişehir LGBT Formation), also bears the name of this symbol.

Come Out!, the first periodical published by the GLF, came out it November 1969.

In 1970, several GLF women, such as Martha Shelley, Lois Hart, Karla Jay, and Michela Griffo went on to form the Lavender Menace, a lesbian activist organization.

In 1970, the drag queen caucus of the GLF, including Marsha P. Johnson and Sylvia Rivera, formed the group Street Transvestite Action Revolutionaries (STAR), which focused on providing support for gay prisoners, housing for homeless gay youth and street people, especially other young "street queens" .

In 1970, the GLF, led by Gary Alinder, protested the American Psychiatric Association’s classification of homosexuality as a mental disorder.

In 1970 "The U.S. Mission" had a permit to use a campground in the Sequoia National Forest. Once it was learned that the group was sponsored by the GLF, the Sequoia National Forest supervisor cancelled the permit, and the campground was closed for the period.

United Kingdom

The UK Gay Liberation Front existed between 1970–1973.

Its first meeting was held in the basement of the London School of Economics on 13 October 1970. Bob Mellors and Aubrey Walter had seen the effect of the GLF in the United States and created a parallel movement based on revolutionary politics. Come Together, the organisation's newspaper,  came out of its Media Workshop the same year.

By 1971, the UK GLF was recognized as a political movement in the national press, holding weekly meetings of 200 to 300 people. The GLF Manifesto was published, and a series of high-profile direct actions, were carried out, such as the disruption of the launch of the Church-based morality campaign, Festival of Light.

The disruption of the opening of the 1971 Festival of Light was one of the most well-organised GLF actions. The first meeting of the Festival of Light was organised by Mary Whitehouse at Methodist Central Hall. Amongst GLF members taking part in this protest were the "Radical Feminists", a group of gender non-conforming males in drag, who invaded and spontaneously kissed each other; others released mice, sounded horns, and unveiled banners, and a contingent dressed as workmen obtained access to the basement and shut off the lights.

Easter 1972 saw the Gay Lib annual conference held in the Guild of Students building at the University of Birmingham.

By 1974, internal disagreements had led to the movement's splintering. Organizations that spun off from the movement included the London Lesbian and Gay Switchboard, Gay News, and Icebreakers. The GLF Information Service continued for a few further years providing gay related resources. GLF branches had been set up in some provincial British towns (e.g., Birmingham, Bradford, Bristol, Leeds, and Leicester) and some survived for a few years longer. The Leicester Gay Liberation Front founded by Jeff Martin was noted for its involvement in the setting up of the local "Gayline", which is still active today and has received funding from the National Lottery. They also carried out a high-profile campaign against the local paper, the Leicester Mercury, which refused to advertise Gayline's services at the time.

The papers of the GLF are among the Hall-Carpenter Archives at the London School of Economics.

Several members of the GLF, including Peter Tatchell, continued campaigning beyond the 1970s under the organisation of OutRage!, which was founded in 1990 and dissolved in 2011, using similar tactics to the GLF (such as "zaps" and performance protest) to attract a significant level of media interest and controversy. It was at this point that a divide emerged within the gay activist movement, mainly due to a difference in ideologies, after which a number of groups including Organization for Lesbian and Gay Alliance (OLGA), the Lesbian Avengers, Sisters of Perpetual Indulgence, Dykes And Faggots Together (DAFT),  Queer Nation, Stonewall (which focused on lobbying tactics) and OutRage! co-existed.

These groups were very influential following the HIV/AIDS pandemic of the 1980s and 1990s and the violence against lesbians and gay men that followed.

Canada 
The first gay liberation groups identifying with the Gay Liberation Front movement in Canada were in Montreal, Quebec.  The Front de Libération Homosexual (FLH) was formed in November 1970, in response to a call for organised activist groups in the city by the publication Mainmise.  Another factor in the group's formation was the response from police against gay establishments in the city after the suspension of civil liberties by Prime Minister Pierre Trudeau in the fall of 1970. This group was short-lived; they were disbanded after over forty members were charged for failure to procure a liquor license at one of the group's events in 1972.

A Vancouver, British Columbia group calling itself the Vancouver Gay Liberation Front emerged in 1971, mostly out of meetings from a local commune, called Pink Cheeks.  The group gained support from The Georgia Straight, a left-leaning newspaper, and opened a drop-in centre and published a newsletter.  The group struggled to maintain a core group of members, and competition from other local groups, such as the Canadian Gay Activists Alliance (CGAA) and the Gay Alliance Toward Equality (GATE), soon led to its demise.

Denmark 
 (BBF; lit. The Gays' Liberation Front) was founded in Copenhagen in 1971, the name inspired by the American Gay Liberation Front. BBF was opposed to the already-established gay rights group "Forbundet af 1948" for being too formal. BBF's activities included going to schools to educate about how it was like being gay, and civil disobedience against the law that prohibited men from publicly dancing together, which was eventually repealed in 1973. The group regularly met at "Bøssehuset" (lit. The gay house) in Christiania.

New Zealand 

Women's Liberation and Māori activist Ngahuia Te Awekotuku initiated the foundation of the Auckland Gay Liberation Front in March 1972, alongside fellow University of Auckland students Nigel Baumber, Ray Waru, and others. In the following months Gay Liberation Fronts established in Wellington, Christchurch and Hamilton, with further groups founded in Rotorua, Nelson, Taranaki, and other places between 1973 and 1977. Gay Liberation groups carried out numerous direct action protests, including guerilla theatre performances, zaps, disrupting meetings of anti-gay groups like the Society for the Promotion of Community Standards, and pickets. Supporting the wellbeing of gays and helping them to come out was an early concern of the movement, leading to the formation of counselling services such as Gay-Aid in Wellington and Gays-An in Christchurch. A "Gay Week" was held from 29 May to 3 June 1972, featuring guerrilla theatre, a forum, dance, and teach-in.

Gay Liberation organizations were not always successful in these aims; sexism and transphobia in the movement also led to the establishment of separate lesbian-feminist and trans organizations, such as SHE - Sisters for Homophile Equality - founded in Christchurch in September 1973. Gay Liberation chapters also worked alongside groups such as Hedesthia, a social and political organization for transvestites and transsexuals.

See also

 Gay Activists Alliance
 Gay Left, UK gay collective and journal
 Hall-Carpenter archives
 List of LGBT rights organizations
 Notable members of the GLF in London: Sam Green, Angela Mason, Mary Susan McIntosh, Bob Mellors, Peter Tatchell, Alan Wakeman
 Notable members of the GLF in the USA: Arthur Bell, Arthur Evans, Tom Brougham, N. A. Diaman, Jim Fouratt, Harry Hay, Brenda Howard, Karla Jay, Marsha P. Johnson, Charles Pitts, Sylvia Rivera, Martha Shelley, Jim Toy, Dan C. Tsang, Allen Young
 Notable members of the GLF in New Zealand: Ngahuia Te Awekotuku, Robin Duff, Peter Wells, Bruce Burnett, Roger Blackley
 OutRage!
 Socialism and LGBT rights
 Stonewall riots
 Stonewall UK

Footnotes

References

External links
 Gay Liberation Front - first newspaper, photos
 Gay Liberation Front - DC, 1970-1972 
 Come Together: British GLF's newspaper, archived at the Bishopsgate Institute
 Leicester Gay Liberation Front
 Photographs of New York GLF meetings, actions and members by Diana Davies at the New York Public Library Digital Collections 
 Resources on the Politics of Homosexuality in the UK from a socialist perspective
 Then and now

Organizations established in 1969
1969 establishments in New York City
 
LGBT political advocacy groups in the United States
History of LGBT civil rights in the United States
Defunct LGBT organizations based in New York City
LGBT history in the United Kingdom
LGBT history in Canada
1969 in LGBT history
Far-left politics in the United States
Articles containing video clips
LGBT political advocacy groups in Canada
LGBT political advocacy groups in the United Kingdom